China Evangelical Seminary ( or abbreviated as ) is a private non-denominational, evangelical seminary. Before moving to Taoyuan City in 2019 Fall semester, its main campus was based in Taipei, Taiwan (Republic of China) for the first 49 years.

History 
China Evangelical Seminary was established in 1970 by James Hudson Taylor III. As founding president, Taylor saw the seminary as an institution to train university graduates in theological education.

In 1979, upon receiving an invitation to serve as general director of Overseas Missionary Fellowship, Taylor recommended to the seminary board to appoint a Chinese to lead the seminary. From 1980 to 1990, the seminary president was Timothy Lin, who also taught Old Testament and Pastoral Ministry.

In 1986, an extension campus was established in the Los Angeles suburb of Monterey Park, which is now known as the China Evangelical Seminary North America. This extension became independent in 2011.

Founded in response to the increased evangelistic work of Christian college students throughout Taiwan, the Seminary has undergone significant growth since its establishment. Forty years after its founding, there are more than 2,000 alumni of China Evangelical Seminary engaged in mission and pastoral work across the world.

Academics

Degrees offered and accreditation 
The seminary is accredited by the Asia Theological Association and currently offers the following degrees:
 Certificate in Christian Studies
 Master of Arts in Intercultural Studies (MA)
 Master of Arts in Marketplace Ministries
 Master of Arts in Religion
 Master of Christian Studies (MCS)
 Master of Divinity/Pastoral Counseling Track (M.Div.)
 Master of Divinity/Pastoral Ministry Track
 Master of Divinity/Theology Track
 Master of Ministry in Lutheran Theology & Church Planting (M.Min.)
 Master of Theology (Th.M.)
 Doctor of Intercultural Studies
 Doctor of Ministry (D.Min.)

Leadership
 James Hudson Taylor III (1970–1980)
 Timothy Lin (1980–1990)
 Caleb T.C. Huang (1990–1998)
 Che-Bin Tan (1998-2004)
 Chien-Kuo Lai (2004-2010)
 Peter K. Chow (2011-2014)
 Lee-Chen Anne Tsai (2015–2020)
 James Hudson Taylor IV (2020-present)

Faculty 
In its early years the faculty at China Evangelical Seminary was supported by faculty from the Chinese Theological Institute of Hong Kong and the Baptist Theological Seminary of Taiwan. Today, the Seminary has thirteen full-time faculty, over twenty part-time instructors, and five faculty members who are undergoing further studies.

Current and past resident faculty members include: 

Andrew W. Butler
George Sheng-Chia Chang
Kline Kai-Hsuan Chang
Robert Tsai-Chin Chang
Hui-Shiang Chao
Jonathan Tien-En Chao
Ling Cheng
Ju-Ping Chiao
Samuel H.H. Chiow
Winston Hsien-Cheng Chiu
Peter K. Chow
Lily K. Chua
Shirley S. Ho
Na-Min Hsieh
Wesley Wei-Hua Hu
Caleb T.C. Huang
Jen-Zen Huang
Archie Wang-Do Hui
Nam-Seng Koh
Paul Kong
I-Chun Kuo
Chien-Kuo Lai
Alicia C. Lee
Paul Chien-Ju Lee
William Y.W. Liao
Timothy Lin
Joshua Chia-En Liu 
Joshua Y.K. Mak
Paul Sung Noh
Che-Bin Tan
James Hudson Taylor III
Anne Lee-Chen Tsai
Alex Shao-Kai Tseng
Daniel Wei-Wen Tu
Cecil K.H. Wang
Emily Y. Wang
David Chi-Yuen Wei
Clement Yung Wen
John Wing-Hong Wong
Timothy San-Jarn Wu
Tsen-Jen Wu

Awards and prizes 
Among its student awards, China Evangelical Seminary awards an annual prize for Excellence in Preaching in honor of the acclaimed American theologian and writer Frederick Buechner. Winners of the prize are selected by faculty in recognition of their significant achievements in the area of homiletics. Additionally, the Seminary has regularly distributed copies of Buechner’s works among its students.

References

External links 
 China Evangelical Seminary website

Protestantism in Taiwan
Universities and colleges in Tainan